FK Palanga was a professional football club based in Palanga, Lithuania. The team competes in the A Lyga, the top division of Lithuanian football in 2018 and 2019 seasons.

History
FK Palanga was founded in 2010 and introduced its first team to the third tier Antra Lyga in 2011.

FK Palanga started off strong and won this championship in the first year with no defeats.  As a result of their victory, they were promoted in 2012 to the Primera Lyga (second tier).

FK Palanga plateaued for the next three years, sitting at the bottom of each standing.

This changed in 2015 as they went from strength to strength. The club changed ownership and their scores started to improve. In the Lithuanian Football League I (made up of 18 teams), they came fifth.

The club came in second in 2016.

In 2017, they won the I Lyga and earned a promotion to the A Lyga, the top division in Lithuania. To celebrate their promotion, the club was re-branded including a new logo and new colors of blue and white. The new logo features "1957", which was when the first football club in Palanga was founded.

In 2019, the team was in 7th position in the A Lyga and faced the Pirma Lyga runners-up DFK Dainava in the playoff series. They won promotion play-offs on aggregate 5–0 and saved their place in A Lyga.

Preparation for the 2019 season was started by signing Russian managers Artyom Gorlov and Aleksandr Ushakhin, who replaced the previously resigned Valdas Trakys.

In summer 2019, Vyacheslav Geraschenko became the new head coach, with Algimantas Briaunys joining as an assistant coach on 21 July 2019.

On 5 December 2019, the Lithuanian Football Federation announce that two A Lyga clubs, FK Atlantas Klaipėda and FK Palanga have been excluded from the A Lyga due to manipulation of the match results, fined 42,000 euros and relegated to the II Lyga. Ten players and one staff were punished with fines and a ban from all football activity ranging from 6 to 12 months.

Honors

League
I Lyga
 Winners (1): 2017
 Runners-up (1): 2016
II Lyga
 Winners (1): 2011

Kit evolution

Club colors 
 Blue and yellow since the 2015 season.
 In 2011–2014, colors were green and yellow.

Last squad
 

|-----
! colspan="9" bgcolor="#B0D3FB" align="left" |
|----- bgcolor="#DFEDFD"

 
|-----
! colspan="9" bgcolor="#B0D3FB" align="left" |
|----- bgcolor="#DFEDFD"
  

 

|-----
! colspan="9" bgcolor="#B0D3FB" align="left" |
|----- bgcolor="#DFEDFD"

Staff

Notable players
Players who have either appeared for their respective national team at any time or received an individual award while at the club.

 Kęstutis Ivaškevičius (2016)
 Lukman Haruna (2018)
 Sergei Mošnikov (2019)
 Andriy Yakovlyev (2019)

Coaches
  Valdas Trakys (2014–2018)
  Artyom Gorlov and  Aleksandr Ushakhin (2019).
  Vyacheslav Geraschenko (July 2019 – 16 September 2019)
  Algimantas Briaunys (since 16 September 2019).

References

External links
  
 Facebook PALANGA official page)
 alyga.lt page (FK Palanga club profile)
 lietuvosfutbolas.lt page (FK Palanga club profile)

 
Defunct football clubs in Lithuania
Sport in Palanga
1957 establishments in Lithuania
Association football clubs established in 1957
Association football clubs disestablished in 2019
2019 disestablishments in Lithuania